Bellampalli is an Assembly Constituency of Telangana Legislative Assembly. It is one of 3 constituencies in Mancherial district. Bellampalli Comes under Peddapalli Lok Sabha Constituency.

Durgam Chinnaiah  of Telangana Rashtra Samithi is representing the constituency for the second time.

Mandals
The Assembly Constituency presently comprises the following Mandals:

Members of Legislative Assembly

Election results

Telangana Legislative Assembly election, 2018

Telangana Legislative Assembly election, 2014

Andhra Pradesh Legislative Assembly election, 2009

See also
 List of constituencies of Telangana Legislative Assembly

References

Assembly constituencies of Telangana
Mancherial district